Ona Lighthouse is located on the small island of Ona in Ålesund Municipality in Møre og Romsdal county, Norway. The lighthouse is built on Onakalven, the highest cliff on the island overlooking the harbor and the few, clustered wooden houses on this small island. The original rotating Fresnel lens remains in use.

History
The lighthouse was built in 1867 and was fully automated in 1971. The continuous white light shines all night long and it also has a bright red flash every 30 seconds. The main light has an intensity of 79,000 candela and the red flash has an intensity of 295,000 candela. The lighthouse is in operation from 16 July until 21 May each year; it does not operate during the rest of the year due to the midnight sun in May–July.

See also

 List of lighthouses in Norway
 Lighthouses in Norway

References

External links

 Norsk Fyrhistorisk Forening 

Lighthouses completed in 1867
Lighthouses in Møre og Romsdal
Ålesund